Sopa or SOPA may refer to:

 Sopa (tribe), an Albanian tribe of the Sharr Mountains
 Lake Sopa, Albania
 School of Performing Arts Seoul, an arts high school in Seoul, South Korea
 Senior Officer Present Afloat, a term used in the U.S. Navy
 Socialist Party of Azania, a political party in South Africa
 Stop Online Piracy Act, a controversial proposed legislation introduced in the U.S. Senate regarding copyright infringement on the Internet
 Sydney Olympic Park Authority, the managers of Sydney Olympic Park

See also 
 
 Sopaipilla, a kind of fried bread
 Sopas, a Filipino creamy macaroni soup
 Soda (disambiguation)
 Soap (disambiguation)